Soud Al Mejmed (born 22 July 1988) is a Kuwaiti footballer who currently plays as a striker.

References 

1988 births
Living people
Kuwaiti footballers
Association football defenders
Kuwait international footballers
2015 AFC Asian Cup players
Qadsia SC players
Sportspeople from Kuwait City
AFC Cup winning players
Footballers at the 2010 Asian Games
Asian Games competitors for Kuwait
Kuwait Premier League players